The 1956–57 season was Stoke City's 50th season in the Football League and the 17th in the Second Division.

With Stoke now entering a fourth season of Second tier football there was much pressure placed on both manager Frank Taylor and the squad for 1956–57. And Stoke made a great effort in an attempt to gain promotion with a fine home record and new floodlights which saw Lincoln City beaten 8–0 with Neville Coleman scoring 7. However, after this Stoke bizarrely failed to find the back of the net in six straight defeats and this poor run of form cost Stoke promotion and in the end they finished in 5th position with 48 points.

Season review

League 
In the 1956–57 season, with the pressure on both the manager and players, Stoke made a great effort at winning promotion back to the First Division. A string of fine home results over Notts County (6–0), Leyton Orient (7–1) and Rotherham United (6–0) raised the fans hopes. Floodlights were installed in October 1956 and the first match under the lights was in the Potteries derby against Port Vale. A crowd of 38,729 turned up to see Stoke win 3–1 to maintain their good form.

Neville Coleman was getting the bulk of Stoke goals which accumulated on 23 February 1957 when Lincoln City arrived at the Victoria Ground. That day Stoke hammered luckless Lincoln 8–0 with Coleman scoring a record seven of the goals. At this stage of the season promotion looked like it could be achieved but all of a sudden Stoke's form completely dropped, after a 1–1 draw with Sheffield United Stoke lost their next six matches and failed to score in any of them and their hopes of promotion died.

FA Cup 
Stoke were drawn away at First Division side Arsenal in the third round and were beaten 4–2 by the "Gunners".

Final league table

Results 

Stoke's score comes first

Legend

Football League Second Division

FA Cup

Friendlies

Squad statistics

References 

Stoke City F.C. seasons
Stoke